The rice weevil (Sitophilus oryzae) is a stored product pest which attacks seeds of several crops, including wheat, rice, and maize.

Description
The adults are usually between 3 and 4.6 mm long, with a long snout. The body color appears to be brown/black, but on close examination, four orange/red spots are arranged in a cross on the wing covers. It is easily confused with the similar looking maize weevil. The maize weevil is typically somewhat larger than the rice weevil, but rice weevils as large as the largest maize weevils and maize weevils nearly as small as the smallest rice weevils have been found. Some external features can be used to differentiate the vast majority of adults, but the only reliable features are on the genitalia (see table below). Both species can hybridize. The genitalic structure of hybrids is unknown.

Biology

Adult rice weevils are able to fly, and can live for up to two years. Females lay 2-6 eggs per day and up to 300 over their lifetime. The female uses strong mandibles to chew a hole into a grain kernel after which she deposits a single egg within the hole, sealing it with secretions from her ovipositor. The larva develops within the grain, hollowing it out while feeding. It then pupates within the grain kernel and emerges 2–4 days after eclosion.

Male S. oryzae produce an aggregation pheromone called sitophilure ((4S,5R)-5-Hydroxy-4-methylheptan-3-one) to which males and females are drawn. A synthetic version is available which attracts rice weevils, maize weevils and grain weevils. Females produce a pheromone which attracts only males.

Its gammaproteobacterial symbiont Candidatus Sodalis pierantonius str. SOPE is able to supply rice weevil with essential vitamins like pantothenic acid, riboflavin, and biotin.  During larvae development, bacteria rely on up-regulation of type three secretion system genes and genes for flagellum so they can infect insect stem cells.

Control
Control of weevils involves locating and removing all potentially infested food sources. Rice weevils in all stages of development can be killed by freezing infested food below -18 °C (0 °F) for a period of three days, or heating to 60 °C (140 °F) for a period of 15 minutes.

See also 
 Granary weevil (Sitophilus granarius)
 Maize weevil (Sitophilus zeamais)

References 

Beetles described in 1763
Dryophthorinae
Storage pests
Taxa named by Carl Linnaeus